Mix-ism is the fourth album from The Mad Capsule Markets. Mix-ism earned The Mad Capsule Markets their first high rated album on the charts and featured the band experimenting and branching out, showing a more melodious sound overall. The album has a very dark feel to it compared to other releases, mainly coming from the lyrical themes featured. The album was also recorded in England.

Track listing
"Mix-ism" – 1:29
"S・S・Music" – 3:56
 – 3:26 
"New Society" – 3:17
"Pet" – 3:12
 – 3:31
  – 2:07
 – 2:16
 – 2:51
"Too Flat" – 2:41
 – 3:23
"IQ Speaker" – 2:26
 – 2:40 
"Problem Children" – 4:28
"Be Silent Fuckin' System" – 3:02 
 – 2:09

Charts

Band members
Hiroshi Kyono - Vocals
Takeshi Ueda - Bass
Motokatsu Miyagami - Drums
Ai Ishigaki - Guitars

References

The Mad Capsule Markets albums
1994 albums